Archbishop Gabriel (secular name George Lvovich Chemodakov, ; June 2, 1961, Sydney, Australia) is bishop of the Russian Orthodox Church Outside Russia, archbishop of Montreal and Canada.

Biography 
In his childhood George was greatly influenced by the Saintly Parish Protopresbyter Rostislav Gan. While George was still young Fr. Rostislav passed away. However upon the return of his older Brother Nikita, he continued to receive gentle encouragement to attend Holy Trinity Orthodox Seminary in Jordanville, New York.

In 1980 he entered Holy Trinity Orthodox Seminary in Jordanville, from which he graduated in 1984 and where he remained as an instructor of Russian culture and other subjects through 1989.

In 1989 he was appointed cell attendant to Metropolitan Vitaly (Ustinov) and then to Bishop Hilarion (Kapral) of Manhattan, then vicar of Eastern American diocese. He continued in this obedience until 1996.

In January 1996 at the meeting of the Synod of Bishops of ROCOR, Metropolitan Vitaly raised the issue of appointing a permanent prelate to govern the ROCOR Diocese of Australia and New Zealand. Metropolitan Vitaly recommended that bishop Hilarion (Kapral) of Washington, be sent to Australia and that George Chemodakov, an unmarried lay worker at the Synod and a graduated  
seminarian, be tonsured to the monastic state and consecrated auxiliary bishop of Brisbane. George always wanted to become a priest and never succeeded at founding a family, therefore he accepted this new path. 

March 1996 George Chemodakov was tonsured a monk with name Gabriel in honour of his great-grandfather Gavriil Luchinin, a priest from Vyatka.

On the Fifth Sunday of Great Lent of 1996, he was ordained hierodeacon by Archbishop Laurus (Škurla) of Syracuse and Holy Trinity. In the same year on the feast of the Entry of Christ into Jerusalem, he was ordained hieromonk by Metropolitan Vitaly (Ustinov).

On 7 July 1996 at the Holy Trinity Monastery in Jordanville, New York, he was consecrated bishop of Brisbane, vicar of the Australian and New Zealand diocese. The consecration was performed by: Metropolitan Vitaly (Ustinov), Archbishop Anthony (Medvedev) of San Francisco and Western America, Archbishop Laurus (Škurla) of Syracuse and Holy Trinity, and Bishop Hilarion (Kapral) of Manhattan.

October 6 of same year he was appointed vicar of Eastern American diocese with title bishop of Manhattan and deputy secretary of the Synod of Bishops of ROCOR.

In October 2001 he was appointed secretary of the Synod of Bishops of ROCOR.

January 2005 he was appointed as member of the Commission for the Conducting of the Fourth All-Diaspora Council.

May 13, 2008 he was appointed Bishop of Montreal and Canada by Decree of the Council of Bishops of ROCOR.

As he obtaining this title, Bishop Gabriel also became rector of Saint-Nicholas Cathedral in Montreal and honorary director of A.S.Pushkin Russian parish school in Montreal. 

In May 2011 at the intercession of the President of the Council of Bishops metropolitan Hilarion, he was elevated to the rank of archbishop

Synod of Bishops of the ROCOR during regular meeting June 30 - July 1, 2016 appointed Archbishop Gabriel as a member of the Board of Trustees of the Holy Trinity Orthodox Seminary, representing the Synod of Bishops on the Board

When the Covid-19 pandemic started, although still retaining the title Archbishop of Montreal and Canada, Chemodakov did not enter Canada or visit his diocese from the moment pandemic border restrictions were applied by Canadian authorities in February 2020 until November 2022.He spent most of his time in the United States during that time.

Views on the 2022 invasion of Ukraine 

Following the Russian invasion of Ukraine on 24 February, Chemodakov disseminated an appeal through his clergy. The appeal justified the invasion of Ukraine on the basis of unfounded claims of genocide against ethnic Russians in the Donbass by "Kievan Fascists". The appeal was deleted from the Diocesan website following backlash from the Quebec media.

References

Sources 
 Bishop Gabriel (Chemodakov), ROCOR(L): "For most of our flock, it is unclear why we suddenly have a different position toward the Moscow Patriarchate."

1961 births
Living people
Australian people of Russian descent
Bishops of the Russian Orthodox Church Outside of Russia
Eastern Orthodox bishops in Canada
Russian Orthodox Christians from Australia
Clergy from Sydney